Panchthupi Haripada Gouribala College, established on 1996, is a general degree college at Panchthupi in Murshidabad district. It offers undergraduate courses in arts. It is affiliated to  University of Kalyani.

Departments

Arts

Bengali
English
Sanskrit
Arabic
History
Political Science
Philosophy

See also

References

External links
Panchthupi Haripada Gouribala College
University of Kalyani
University Grants Commission
National Assessment and Accreditation Council

Universities and colleges in Murshidabad district
Colleges affiliated to University of Kalyani
Educational institutions established in 1996
1996 establishments in West Bengal